The men's 100 metre backstroke competition of the swimming events at the 1973 World Aquatics Championships took place on September 4.

Records
Prior to the competition, the existing world and championship records were as follows.

The following records were established during the competition:

Results

Heats
29 swimmers participated in 4 heats. The eight fastest times qualified for the final.

Final
The results of the final are below.

References

Backstroke 0100 metre, men's
World Aquatics Championships